Crispin rival de son maître is a farce in one act by Alain-René Lesage first produced in 1707. Its plot concerns the effort of a valet who, rather than try to further his masters interests as is typical of the period, tries to supplant that master in love and gain.

1707 plays
Plays by Alain-René Lesage